Alison Duke (22 July 1915 – 6 November 2005) was a British classicist, academic, and Girl Guides leader.

Biography
Duke was born on 22 July 1915 in Cambridge, Cambridgeshire, England. Her parents were William Holden Duke, an English classical scholar at Jesus College, Cambridge, and Emilie Johanna von Lippe, a German aristocrat. She was educated at the Perse School for Girls, a private school in Cambridge. She was enrolled into 1st Cambridge Company, Girl Guides Association, at the age of 11. She studied classics at Girton College, Cambridge, from 1934 to 1939, graduating with a Bachelor of Arts (BA) degree.

In 1940, Duke became a lecturer at the University of Reading. During the Second World War, she contributed to the war effort via her work with the Girl Guides. She was posted to Greece with the Guide International Service between 1944 and 1946. During this time, she worked at Greek refugee camps in Egypt, ensured that relief supplies reached a women's prison in Athens, and accepted the arms surrendered by ELAS guerrillas in Amphissa.

In 1946, Duke returned to her alma mater, Girton College, Cambridge, where she had been appointed an assistant tutor. She would remain at Girton until she retired. In 1951, she was promoted to tutor and succeeded Norah Christina Jolliffe as director of studies in Classics. She officially became the college's first senior tutor in 1968, holding the post until 1974. She additionally taught palaeography within the Faculty of Classics, University of Cambridge, where she was an assistant lecturer from 1952 and then a lecturer from 1957. In 1982, she retired from full-time academia and was made a life fellow by Girton.

Duke died on 6 November 2005, aged 90. Her funeral service was held on 21 November in the chapel of Girton College.

References

1915 births
2005 deaths
British classical scholars
Fellows of Girton College, Cambridge
Girlguiding
Alumni of Girton College, Cambridge
Academics of the University of Reading
People educated at the Perse School for Girls
Members of the University of Cambridge faculty of classics